Maria Johanna Geertruda "Anne-Marie" Spierings (born 28 September 1976) is a Dutch politician of Democrats 66 (D66). She has served as the party's chairperson since 6 October 2018 until 2021, and has been a member of the Provincial Council of North Brabant since 22 January 2021.

Early life and education 
Spierings was born in Heesch, North Brabant. She studied environmental science at Radboud University in Nijmegen.

Career 
From 1999 to 2015, Spierings worked at Arcadis, a Dutch consulting firm. In 2011, she was elected into the Provincial Council of North Brabant as a member of D66. She was re-elected in 2015, but left the council to become a deputy in the provincial executive. Her portfolio included agricultural development, energy and governance.

On 6 October 2018, Spierings was elected party chair of D66. On 22 January 2021, she was re-installed as a member of the Provincial Council of North Brabant, replacing Eric Logister.

Electoral history

References 

1976 births
21st-century Dutch politicians
21st-century Dutch women politicians
Chairmen of the Democrats 66
Democrats 66 politicians
Living people
Members of the Provincial Council of North Brabant
Members of the Provincial-Executive of North Brabant
People from Bernheze
People from Sint-Michielsgestel
Radboud University Nijmegen alumni